is an anime adaptation of the God Eater video game. It is animated by Ufotable and began airing on July 12, 2015 after a one-week delay. It was later acquired by MVM Films from December 2017 to be released that year.

Plot
In 2071, an organization known as Fenrir, located in the post-apocalyptic nation of the New Asian Union (NAU), helps humanity protect itself against monsters known as Aragami using divine weapons called "God Arcs". Composed of biological material called "Oracle Cells", God Arcs are wielded by a group of soldiers called, "God Eaters". The original (or "Old-Type") Arcs could initially only hold one form, either melee or ranged, but soon a new type of God Arc is developed that could switch between cannon and blade form.

Characters

Broadcast
A 12-minute prequel original video animation was made by Ufotable and aired on September 28, 2009. Ufotable later animated an anime television series directed by Takayuki Hirao with character designs by Keita Shimizu. The anime is part of the franchise's fifth anniversary. The series began airing on July 12, 2015 on Tokyo MX, BS 11, and other stations after the first episode was delayed by a week due to production issues and a special short titled God Eater Extra aired in its place. Four extra episodes have preempted regular episodes that were previously scheduled. After episode nine aired as the final initial run televised episode, the remaining episodes aired in March 2016. The opening theme is "Feed A" by Oldcodex and the ending theme is "Ruined Land" performed by Go Shiina feat. Naomi. Ufotable used hand-drawn animation to animate the God Arc weapons as opposed to computer animation.

Notes

References

External links
 

Anime television series based on video games
Ufotable
God Eater
Aniplex
Works based on Bandai Namco video games